Mallam Yahaya (born 31 December 1974) is a Ghanaian football manager and former player who played as a midfielder or forward. He made 12 appearances for the Ghana national team scoring once.

International career
Yahaya was member of the Ghana national team at the 1996 Summer Olympics in Atlanta.

Managerial career
Following spells as coach of Nzema Kotoko and King Faisal Babies, Yahaya was announced as manager of New Edubiase United in November 2016. He resigned in May 2017.

References

External links
 
 
 Profile Waldhof

1974 births
Living people
Footballers from Kumasi
Ghanaian footballers
Association football midfielders
Ghana international footballers
Olympic footballers of Ghana
Footballers at the 1996 Summer Olympics
1996 African Cup of Nations players
Bundesliga players
Torino F.C. players
Borussia Dortmund players
Borussia Dortmund II players
SV Waldhof Mannheim players
Stuttgarter Kickers players
GKS Katowice players
VfR Mannheim players
ASV Durlach players
FC Astoria Walldorf players
Ghanaian football managers
King Faisal Babes F.C. managers
New Edubiase United F.C. managers
Ghanaian expatriate footballers
Ghanaian expatriate sportspeople in Italy
Expatriate footballers in Italy
Ghanaian expatriate sportspeople in Germany
Expatriate footballers in Germany
Ghanaian expatriate sportspeople in Poland
Expatriate footballers in Poland